Alexander Rubel (b. 27 December 1969) is a German-Romanian historian of the Antiquity.

Alexander Rubel studied History, Germanistics and Philosophy at the University of Konstanz. He was a researcher at the Department of Ancient History of the University of Konstanz. In 2000 he relocated to Iași, Romania, as Director of the Iași branch of the Goethe-Institut. He became a DAAD lecturer at the Alexandru Ioan Cuza University. He is presently the director of the German Cultural Center in Iași., researcher at and Director of the Iași Institute of Archaeology.

Selected works
 Stadt in Angst. Religion und Politik in Athen während des Peloponnesischen Krieges, Wissenschaftliche Buchgesellschaft, Darmstadt 2000, 
 Rumänien in Europa. Geschichte, Kultur, Politik, Hartung-Gorre & Editura Univ. „Alexandru Ioan Cuza“, Konstanz-Iași 2002,  und 
 With Cătălin Turliuc: Totalitarism. Ideologie şi realitate socială în România şi RDG = Totalitarismus, Editura Univ. „Alexandru Ioan Cuza“, Iași 2006,  und  
 With Andrei Corbea-Hoişie: „Czernowitz bei Sadagora“. Identitäten und kulturelles Gedächtnis im mitteleuropäischen Raum, Hartung-Gorre & Editura Univ. „Alexandru Ioan Cuza“, Konstanz-Iași 2006,  and 
 Friedrich Schiller zwischen Historisierung und Aktualisierung. Akten eines Kolloquiums in Jassy anlässlich des 250. Geburtstags des Dichters am 10. November 2009, Hartung-Gorre & Editura Univ. „Alexandru Ioan Cuza“, Konstanz und Iași 2011,  und 
 Die Griechen. Kultur und Geschichte in klassischer und archaischer Zeit, Marix Verlag, Wiesbaden 2012, 
 With Iulia Dumitrache, Imperium und Romanisierung. Neue Forschungsansätze aus Ost und West zu Ausübung, Transformation und Akzeptanz von Herrschaft im Römischen Reich''', Konstanz, Hartung-Gorre Verlag 2013, 
 Fear and Loathing in Ancient Athens. Religion and Politics during the Peloponnesian War, Durham, Acumen Publishing 2014, 
 Religion und Kult der Germanen'', Kohlhammer Verlag, Stuttgart 2015,

References

1969 births
Living people
Romanian archaeologists
21st-century Romanian historians
Romanian philosophers
20th-century German archaeologists
20th-century German historians
German male writers
German philosophers
Academic staff of Alexandru Ioan Cuza University
University of Konstanz alumni
21st-century German archaeologists